Sharon Presley (March 23, 1943 – October 31, 2022) was an American  libertarian feminist, writer, activist, and lecturer in psychology.

Education and work 
Presley received a B.A. in psychology from the University of California, Berkeley and an M.A. in psychology from San Francisco State. In 1981, she received a Ph.D. in social psychology from City University of New York. Between 1982 and her retirement in 2009, she had a succession of instructor, adjunct, and visiting, positions at thirteen different schools, including California State University, East Bay where she was a lecturer.

Activism

Presley was apolitical until she read Ayn Rand at the age of nineteen. She was radicalized when her boyfriend, who was leader of the Cal Conservatives for Political Action, was arrested in Berkeley, California. She joined  the Free Speech Movement, Students Opposed to Conscription, and the Alliance of Libertarian Activists ("ALA").

In 1972, Presley helped owner John Muller launch Laissez Faire Books, a libertarian store in Greenwich Village, New York. She worked on promotional materials there until 1977.

Presley was a founder of the Association of Libertarian Feminists (ALF). In the mid-1970s, Presley was the national coordinator then later became the executive director for ALF.

Views
In 1982, Presley and Lynn Kinsky wrote that government laws and regulations had created a crisis in child-care due to the restrictions in zoning, licensing, and  health and safety regulations.

Presley said in 2013 that libertarian feminism is not different from mainstream feminism except in the unwillingness of libertarians to resort to government solutions to social problems. She said she prefers "a hand up" from private sources such as mutual aid societies "rather than a handout" from government. She said in 1980 that libertarian feminists "don't believe in seeking government solutions to women's problems".

She rejected the view that transgender women are not women, or that they should not take part in the feminist dialogue. She maintained that transgender people should be judged on their merits, like other people.  Presley once stated, "Depending on distant bureaucracies run by white men who have no understanding has been problematic for women; there is no reason to assume that trans people will be any better served by those bureaucracies.

Presley believed that the government should not subsidize abortion for the poor, nor make any laws limiting or banning abortion; she maintained that abortion should be available as a choice. Likewise, she believed that birth control pills should not be subject to government subsidy or restriction.

Presley contended that the government should not make any laws regarding prostitution. She also opined that the customers of prostitutes should not be prosecuted. In this regard, Presley differs from feminists who wish to restrict prostitution. She maintained that, despite the general agreement among feminists that violent pornography is degrading to women, that there should be no government laws limiting such pornography, which she describes as a symptom of a societal problem. Instead, she suggested that the problem's cause should be identified and treated with education. She disagreed with Susan Brownmiller that anti-obscenity laws would solve the problem.

In her 2010 self-help book, Standing Up to Experts and Authorities: How to Avoid Being Intimidated, Manipulated, and Abused, Presley cited scholarly studies to describe how people may unknowingly disengage their critical thinking in the face of apparent authority. This reaction masks the possibility that the authority's assertions may be challenged. Presley gave the reader pointers on how to overcome their initial reaction and regain a calm and assertive footing.

Death
Presley died on October 31, 2022, after struggling with various health issues.

Selected bibliography

Books

Ph.D thesis

References

Sources

External links

, Presley's political professional site.
 Presley's political activist site.

1943 births
2022 deaths
20th-century American women
21st-century American women
American book editors
American feminist writers
American libertarians
American psychology writers
American women in business
American women non-fiction writers
California State University, East Bay faculty
Feminist studies scholars
Individualist feminists
Women science writers